Val-de-Moder (literally Vale of Moder) is a commune in the Bas-Rhin department of northeastern France. The municipality was established on 1 January 2016 by merger of the former communes of Pfaffenhoffen, Uberach and La Walck. On 1 January 2019, the former commune Ringeldorf was merged into Val-de-Moder.

Population
The population data given in the table below refer to the commune in its geography as of January 2020.

See also 
Communes of the Bas-Rhin department

References 

Communes of Bas-Rhin